Porthesaroa is a genus of moths in the subfamily Lymantriinae. The genus was erected by Erich Martin Hering in 1926.

Species
Porthesaroa aclyta Collenette, 1953 Madagascar
Porthesaroa aureopsis Hering, 1926 Madagascar
Porthesaroa brunea Griveaud, 1973 Madagascar
Porthesaroa lacipa Hering, 1926 Cameroon
Porthesaroa lithoides (Collenette, 1936) Madagascar
Porthesaroa maculata Collenette, 1938 Congo
Porthesaroa nicotrai Hartig, 1940 Somalia
Porthesaroa noctua Hering, 1926 western Africa
Porthesaroa parvula (Kenrick, 1914) Madagascar
Porthesaroa procincta Saalmüller, 1880
Porthesaroa sogai Griveaud, 1973 Madagascar
Porthesaroa xanthoselas Collenette, 1959

References

Lymantriinae